The Agharkar Research Institute (ARI) is located in Pune, Maharashtra, India. Agharkar Research Institute (ARI) is an autonomous, grant-in-aid research institute of the Department of Science and Technology (DST), Government of India. It was established in 1946 by the Maharashtra Association for the Cultivation of Science as MACS Research Institute and renamed as ARI in 1992 in honour and memory of its founder Director, late Professor Shankar Purushottam Agharkar. It conducts research activities in animal sciences, microbial sciences and plant sciences.

References

External links
The Official Website of ARI

Research institutes in Pune
Universities and colleges in Pune
Educational institutions established in 1946
1946 establishments in India